The Oldham and Rochdale Line (ORL) is a tram line of the Manchester Metrolink in Greater Manchester running from Manchester city centre to Rochdale town centre via Oldham, using most of the trackbed of the former Oldham Loop Line which closed in 2009. The line was re-opened in a modified form as a tramway between 2012 and 2014, as part of phase three of the system's expansion.

Route
The line runs from  running north-east to Oldham before turning north and then north-west to Rochdale. The line mostly follows the trackbed of the former heavy rail Oldham Loop Line. However, it leaves the former railway trackbed at each edge of Oldham town centre, and runs through the town centre on a new street running route.

From Victoria, the line shares track with the Bury Line as far as Irk Valley Junction, where it diverges to the east, following the former Cheetham Hill loop line. Near the junction with the Bury Line a link runs into the Queens Road tram depot.

After passing over the viaduct, the line then re-joins the former railway trackbed. For a short distance, as far as just beyond , the line runs as a single track, the other track being used by freight trains to the Greater Manchester Waste Disposal Depot.

Rather than running directly into Rochdale railway station as the former railway did, the tram line now passes over the Calder Valley Line on a flyover and into a tram stop outside the railway station, it then continues on-street to the line's terminus at  tram stop.

Route map

History

Pre-Metrolink

The route was originally a railway, the Oldham Loop Line, which was built in stages: The first railway to reach Oldham was a branch line which opened in March 1842, constructed by the Manchester and Leeds Railway (M&LR). This line ran from Middleton Junction, from the Manchester to Leeds line which had opened the previous year, to Oldham Werneth railway station: Oldham Werneth was located inconveniently from the town centre in the lower part of Oldham, so in 1847, the line was extended one mile to Oldham Mumps railway station. By this time the Manchester and Leeds Railway had become part of the Lancashire and Yorkshire Railway (LYR).

In August 1863, a six-mile (10 km) extension was opened from Oldham Mumps to Rochdale, also connecting to the Manchester-Leeds line, effectively creating a loop from Middleton to Rochdale.

The line between Middleton Junction and Oldham was steeply inclined and therefore difficult to work; until 1854 the line had been cable-worked. In 1873, the LYR obtained an act to build a more direct, and less steeply inclined line between Oldham and Manchester, running via Failsworth, and joining the Manchester-Leeds line at Thorpes Bridge Junction. This line was opened in May 1880, therefore completing what became known as the Oldham Loop Line. The original line from Middleton Junction to Oldham closed in 1964.

Unlike the Bury and Altrincham lines, the Oldham line was never electrified, and was operated by steam and then, from 1958, by diesels.

Conversion to Metrolink
The Oldham Loop Line was identified by transport planners in the 1980s, as one of the local railway lines in the Greater Manchester area, which was used mostly for local traffic, and could therefore be split off from the main line network and converted to light-rail operation. The network was however to be built in stages, and the Oldham line was not included in the first phase of the Metrolink in the early 1990s due to cost reasons, the Bury Line and Altrincham Line being chosen for conversion instead.

The line was however included in the third phase of the system's development, which also included new lines to Ashton-under-Lyne, East Didsbury and Manchester Airport.

Several new features were to be included as part of the conversion:

This would allow a 1.5 mile (2.4 km) section of the old railway through the former Oldham Mumps railway station to be abandoned.

Railway operations ended on 3 October 2009, and the Oldham Loop Line was closed for conversion. The line was completely rebuilt, with all of the former infrastructure, including the former stations and station buildings demolished, and replaced, and overhead wiring added.

The line was re-opened in phases: Tram services started on 13 June 2012 between Manchester and : As a temporary measure, until the town centre line was completed, the former railway line through Oldham Mumps was retained, and a temporary tram stop constructed in place of the former railway station. A permanent stop called Oldham Mumps was later opened on the town centre line in a different location. The Oldham town centre line opened on 27 January 2014, allowing the section of former railway line, and temporary stop at Oldham Mumps to be permanently closed. The Rochdale town centre line opened on 31 March 2014.

Proposed future development
In January 2016, Jim McMahon, MP for Oldham West and Royton, proposed two loop extensions to the metrolink system around Oldham.  The link would add a spur from Westwood tram stop to Middleton town centre, before joining the Bury Line near , in line with the proposed Middleton extension.

The Ashton Loop would extend the line beyond Ashton town centre to Oldham Mumps. Both would connect Rochdale to its neighbouring towns without the need to travel in and out of Manchester city centre.  
Initial high level feasibility work was undertaken by officials at Transport for Greater Manchester which demonstrated the route is technically possible.

Services
As of February 2018, the ORL forms the northern half of the Metrolink route 5 which runs as follows:

On weekday evenings and Sundays the frequency is reduced to 12 minutes on the whole route and all trams run through to Rochdale Town Centre.

References

External links

 LRTA entry on this line

Manchester Metrolink lines
Oldham
Rochdale
Chadderton
Former railway lines converted to Manchester Metrolink lines